Ghanaian cuisine is the cuisine of the Ghanaian people. Ghanaian main dishes are organized around a starchy staple food, which goes with a sauce or soup containing a protein source. The main ingredients for the vast majority of soups and stews are tomatoes, hot peppers and onions. As a result, most of the Ghanaian soups and stews are red or orange in appearance.

Main staple foods

The typical staple foods in the southern part of Ghana include cassava and plantain. In the northern part, the main staple foods include millet and sorghum. Yam, maize and beans are used across Ghana as staple foods. Sweet potatoes and cocoyam are also important in the Ghanaian diet and cuisine. With the advent of globalization, cereals such as rice and wheat have been increasingly incorporated into Ghanaian cuisine. The foods below represent Ghanaian dishes made out of these staple foods.

Foods made with maize
Akple, a traditional meal of the Ewe, is made with corn flour and can be eaten with pepper sauces, stews or any soup. It is typically served with okra soup (fetridetsi) or herring stew (abɔbitadi). Akple is never prepared in the same way as banku. An important distinguishing factor between the two products is that banku requires the use of a special preformulated watery material called "Slightly-Fermented Corn-Cassava Dough Mix", cooked to a soft solid consistency of "Corn-Cassava Dough AFLATA", en route to a soft form of Banku with further cooking, and the "Slightly-Fermented Corn-Cassava Dough Mix" is never 'the signature material' of any form of the Akple product. 
Banku was formulated by the Ga Dangme (or Ga) tribe of the Greater Accra Region, as a slight deviation from the process of preparation of Ga-Kenkey, requiring a different manipulation of 'THE AFLATA' mixed with cassava dough, but unlike Ga-Kenkey it does not require the use of corn husk. One particular Major-Clan of the GaDangme (or Ga) tribe is credited with the original recipe of the banku meal even though it may be argued among the major clans. Sometimes only cornflour is used but in many areas cassava dough is cooked together with the fermented corn dough.
 Banku cooked with cassava and corn dough mixture is called agbelimorkple by the Ewe people while the one without cassava dough mixture is known as Kutornu-kple (Cotonou banku)
Mmore is cooked fermented corn dough without cassava, prepared like banku among the Akan people. 
Kenkey/komi/dokonu is fermented corn dough, wrapped in corn originating from the Ga who call it komi or Ga kenkey. Another variety originating from the Fanti people is Fante dokono or Fanti kenkey which is wrapped with plantain leaves that give it a different texture, flavour and colour as compared to the Ga kenkey. Both are boiled for long periods into consistent solid balls.
Tuo zaafi is a millet, sorghum or maize dish originating from Northern Ghana.
Fonfom is a maize dish popular in south-western Ghana.
 Abolo-prepared by steaming corn dough and sugar mixture is a delicacy among the Ewes. It is eaten with various soups or sauces.
 Yoroyoro is widely eaten across Dagbon and many parts of Northern Ghana. It is made by boiling maize till it is softened. The food is eaten with pepper and onions.

Foods made with rice
Waakye—a dish of rice and beans with a purple-brown color. The color comes from the indigenous grass Sorghum bicolor. This side dish bears striking similarities to West Indian rice and peas. The rice is cooked and steamed with an indigenous leaf, coconut and a pulse such as black-eyed peas or kidney beans.
Omo Tuo/Rice ball—sticky mashed rice, normally eaten with groundnut soup.
Plain rice—boiled rice accompanies many of the variety of red stews.
Jollof rice—rice cooked in a stew consisting of stock, tomatoes, spices, and meat boiled together. This dish originated from the Djolof traders from Senegal who settled in the Zongos before the colonial period. Adapted for local Ghanaian tastes, it is typically eaten with goat, lamb, chicken or beef that has been stewed, roasted or grilled.
Fried rice—Chinese-style fried rice adapted to Ghanaian tastes.
Angwa moo—also referred to as "oiled rice". This is unlike fried rice which you cook the rice before frying. Oiled rice is cooked by first onion-frying the oil, then adding water after the onions have browned, giving the rice a different fragrance. The rice is then cooked in the water-oil mixture, to give the rice an oily feel when ready. It may be cooked with vegetables or minced meat, added to taste. It is mostly served with earthenware-ground pepper, with either tinned sardines or fried eggs complementing it.
Ngwo moo (palm rice)—an alternative to the oiled rice, cooked with palm oil instead of cooking oil. The taste is determined by the type of palm oil used.

Foods made with cassava
Kokonte or abete—from dried peeled cassava powder usually served alongside groundnut soup, consisting of a variety of meat such as tripe, lamb, or smoked  served
Fufu—pounded cassava and plantain, pounded yam and plantain, or pounded cocoyam/taro. This side dish is always accompanied by one of the many varieties of Ghanaian soups.
Gari—made from cassava. Often served with Red red, a fish and black-eyed pea stew, or shito and fish.
Attiéké or Akyeke—made from cassava and popular among the Ahanta, Nzema and Akan-speaking people of Ivory Coast.
Plakali—made from cassava and popular among the Ahanta, Nzema and Akan-speaking people of Ivory Coast.
 Yakayake - made from steamed grated cassava is a favourite among the Ewe people.It is eaten with various stews or soups.

Foods made with beans
A deviation to the starch and stew combination are Red red and tubaani, primarily based on vegetable protein (beans). Red red is a popular Ghanaian bean and fish stew served with fried ripe plantain and often accompanied with gari, fish and pulses. It earns its name from the palm oil that tints the bean stew and the bright orange color of the fried ripe plantain. Tubaani is a boiled bean cake, called moin moin in Nigeria.

Foods made with yam

Ampesie—boiled yam. It may also be made with plantain, cocoyam, potatoes, yams or cassava. This side dish is traditionally eaten with fish stew containing tomatoes, oil and spices.
Yam fufu—fufu made with yam instead of cassava or plantain or cocoyam, this soft dough is traditionally eaten with Ghanaian soup. It is popular in Northern and southeastern Ghana.
Mpotompoto (yam casserole or porridge)—slices of yam cooked with much water and pepper, onions, tomatoes, salt and preferred seasoning.

Soups and stews
Most Ghanaian side dishes are served with a stew, soup or mako (a spicy condiment made from raw red and green chilies, onions and tomatoes (pepper sauce). Ghanaian stews and soups are quite sophisticated, with liberal and delicate use of exotic ingredients, a wide variety of flavours, spices and textures.

Vegetables such as palm nuts, peanuts, cocoyam leaves, ayoyo, spinach, wild mushroom, okra, garden eggs (eggplant), tomatoes and various types of pulses are the main ingredients in Ghanaian soups and stews and in the case of pulses, may double as the main protein ingredient.

Beef, pork, goat, lamb, chicken, smoked turkey, tripe, dried snails, and fried fish are common sources of protein in Ghanaian soups and stews, sometimes mixing different types of meat and occasionally fish into one soup. Soups are served as a main course rather than a starter. It is also common to find smoked meat, fish and seafood in Ghanaian soups and stews.

 They include crab, shrimp, periwinkles, octopus, snails, grubs, duck, offal, and pig's trotters. Also oysters.
Meat, mushrooms and seafood may be smoked, salted or dried for flavour enhancement and preservation. Salt fish is widely used to flavour fish based stews. Spices such as thyme, garlic, onions, ginger, peppers, curry, basil, nutmeg, sumbala, Tetrapleura tetraptera (prekese) and bay leaf are delicately used to achieve the exotic and spicy flavours that characterize Ghanaian cuisine.

Palm oil, coconut oil, shea butter, palm kernel oil and peanut oil are important Ghanaian oils used for cooking or frying and may sometimes not be substituted for in certain Ghanaian dishes. For example, using palm oil in okro stew, eto, fante fante, red red or Gabeans, egusi stew and mpihu/mpotompoto (similar to poi). Coconut oil, palm kernel oil and shea butter have lost their popularity for cooking in Ghana due to the introduction of refined oils and negative Ghanaian media adverts targeted at those oils. They are now mostly used in few traditional homes, for soap making and by commercial (street food) food vendors as a cheaper substitute to refined cooking oils.

Common Ghanaian soups are groundnut soup, light (tomato) soup, kontomire (taro leaves) soup, palm nut soup, ayoyo soup and okra soup.

Ghanaian tomato stew or gravy is a stew that is often served with rice or waakye. Other vegetable stews are made with kontomire, garden eggs, egusi (pumpkin seeds), spinach, okra, etc.

Among the Ewes , some soups are prepared with gboma (solanum macrocarpa)and also yevugboma(European gboma. Water leaf) or ademe (jute mallow ). These are eaten with the various varieties of akple or abolo (steamed corn dough)or yakayake (steamed cassava dough).

Breakfast

Most of the dishes mentioned above are served during lunch and supper in modern Ghana. However, those engaged in manual labour and a large number of urban dwellers still eat these foods for breakfast and will usually buy them from the streets. 
Another popular breakfast is called huasa koko (northern porridge). It is usually prepared in Northern Ghana, sweet, and often eaten with koose or bread with groundnut. 

In large Ghanaian cities, working-class people would often take fruit, tea, chocolate drink, oats, rice porridge/cereal(locally called rice water) or kooko (fermented maize porridge) and koose/akara or maasa (beans, ripe plantain and maize meal fritters). Other breakfast foods include grits, tombrown (roasted maize porridge), and millet porridge.

Bread is an important feature in Ghanaian breakfast and baked foods. Ghanaian bread, which is known for its good quality, is baked with wheat flour and sometimes cassava flour is added for an improved texture. There are four major types of bread in Ghana. They are tea bread (similar to the baguette), sugar bread (which is a sweet bread), brown (whole wheat) bread, and butter bread. Rye bread, oat bread and malt bread are also quite common.

Sweet foods

There are many sweet local foods which have been marginalized due to their low demand and long preparation process. Ghanaian sweet foods (or confectionery) may be fried, barbecued, boiled, roasted, baked or steamed.

Fried sweet foods include cubed and spiced ripe plantain (kelewele) sometimes served with peanuts. Koose made from peeled beans (and its close twin acarajé or akara made from beans which are not peeled), maasa, pinkaaso, and bofrot/Puff-puff (made from wheat flour);  waakye  dzowey and nkate cake (made from peanuts); kaklo and tatale (ripe plantain fritters); kube cake and kube toffee (made from coconut); bankye krakro, gari biscuit, and krakye ayuosu (made from cassava); condensed milk, toffee, plantain chips (or fried plantain) and wagashi (fried farmer's cheese) are fried Ghanaian savory foods (confectionery).

Kebabs are popular barbecues and can be made from beef, goat, pork, soy flour, sausages and guinea fowl. Other roasted savoury foods include roasted plantain, maize, yam and cocoyam.

Steamed fresh maize, yakeyake, kafa, akyeke, tubani, moimoi (bean cake), emo dokonu (rice cake) and esikyire dokonu (sweetened kenkey) are all examples of steamed and boiled foods whilst sweet bread, (plantain cake), and meat pie similar to Jamaican patties and empanadas are baked savoury foods. Aprapransa, eto (mashed yam) and atadwe milk (tiger nut juice) are other savory foods. Gari soakings is a modern favorite. It is a blend of gari (dried, roasted cassava), sugar, groundnut (peanut) and milk.

Beverages

In southern Ghana, Ghanaian drinks such as asaana (made from fermented maize) are common. Along Lake Volta and in southern Ghana, palm wine extracted from the palm tree can be found, but it ferments quickly and then it is used to distill akpeteshie (a local gin). Akpeteshie can be distilled from molasses too. In addition, a beverage can be made from kenkey and refrigerated into what is in Ghana known as ice kenkey. In northern Ghana, bisaab/sorrel, toose and lamujee (a spicy sweetened drink) are common non-alcoholic beverages whereas pitoo (a local beer made of fermented millet) is an alcoholic beverage.

In urban areas of Ghana drinks may include fruit juice, cocoa drinks, fresh coconut water, yogurt, ice cream, carbonated drinks, malt drinks and soy milk. In addition, Ghanaian distilleries produce alcoholic beverages from cocoa, malt, sugar cane, local medicinal herbs and tree barks. They include bitters, liqueur, dry gins, beer, and aperitifs.

Street foods in Ghana
Street food is very popular in both rural and urban areas of Ghana. Most Ghanaian families eat at least three times a week from street food vendors, from whom all kinds of foods can be bought, including staple foods such as kenkey, red red and waakye. Other savoury foods such as raw steak, boiled corn cob, boflot (ball-float) and roasted plantain are sold mainly by street food vendors.

Ice kenkey is a popular chilled dessert sold by street vendors in open-air markets.

Common Ghanaian dishes

See also

 Chop bar
 West African cuisine
 List of African cuisines
 La Tante DC10 Restaurant

References

Further reading 
There are a some cookbooks which concentrate on Ghanaian food, including the following.

 Osseo-Asare, Fran and Baeta, Barbara.  2018.   The Ghana cookbook.  Hippocrene Books.  ISBN 978-0781813433

External links
 Ghanaian food on Ghanaweb.com

 
West African cuisine